Eleftherios Synadinos (born 6 July 1955 in Argos Orestiko) is a Greek politician and has been a Member of the European Parliament (MEP) from Greece since 2014. He represented the far right Golden Dawn party from 2014 until 21 April 2018. On 22 June 2018, in Thessaloniki he announced the founding declaration of his new Political Party called Patriotic Radical Union (PAT.RI.E.)

Synadinos is a retired army officer. He advanced to the rank of Lieutenant General, commanding the Greek Army's special forces. He served in a variety of positions in NATO coordination bodies, and in the Greek forces opposed to the Turkish invasion of Cyprus.

On 9 March 2016, he was expelled from Plenary by the President of the European Parliament, Martin Schulz, for calling Turks “dirty and polluted” during a debate. Referencing article 165 of the European Parliament's rules of procedure, Schulz stated that Synadinos' sentence represented "a breach of the values of the EU”.

References

1955 births
Living people
MEPs for Greece 2014–2019
Golden Dawn (political party) politicians
People from Argos Orestiko